Macdona is an unincorporated community and census-designated place in Bexar County, Texas, United States.  As of the 2010 census it had a population of 559. Macdona lies along the Union Pacific rail line near Loop 1604 in southwest Bexar County. It is part of the San Antonio Metropolitan Statistical Area.

History
Macdona was named for George Macdona, an Englishman, who owned the townsite. The first recorded sale of town lots was dated July 7, 1886. The Macdona post office (78054) opened in 1886. On September 1, 1909, the Artesian Belt opened a  line between Macdona and Christine. In 2000, Macdona was reported to have 297 persons.  The town is part of the 210 and 726 area code districts.

Climate
The climate in this area is characterized by hot, humid summers and generally mild to cool winters.  According to the Köppen Climate Classification system, Macdona has a humid subtropical climate, abbreviated "Cfa" on climate maps.

References

Census-designated places in Texas
Census-designated places in Bexar County, Texas
Unincorporated communities in Texas
Unincorporated communities in Bexar County, Texas
Greater San Antonio
Populated places established in 1886
1886 establishments in Texas